Wildfire is a wooden roller coaster at Kolmården Wildlife Park located in Kolmården, Sweden. Manufactured by Rocky Mountain Construction, the roller coaster is both the fastest wooden coaster in Europe, and second tallest wooden coaster in the world.

History
In April 2014, Wildfire was revealed in a press release on Kolmården's official website. The roller coaster was Rocky Mountain Construction's first in Europe, and Vekoma manufactured the power and control systems of the ride. On 28 October 2016, the coaster ceased operations after only one season when its permit was revoked by the government citing environmental concerns. Speculation ensued that the ride may be torn down as a result. On 28 January 2017, a report surfaced that Wildfire would be allowed to remain standing while a license to continue operation was being discussed. The zoning for the roller coaster was officially approved by the county's council in March 2017, and Wildfire reopened in June 2017.

Ride experience
After the train is checked and dispatched, it makes a sharp right hand turn into the  chain lift hill. Once at the crest, it enters a very large dip (or gigantic dip) into the fastest, right hand banked turn before passing over another crest and into the first drop. From here the train twists through two airtime hills and two high banked turns before encountering its next inversion, a heartline roll. Following this, the track descends to ground level as it passes through sixteen more strong airtime hills, prior to a second heartline roll. The ride finishes with a ski-slalom style right to left section before hitting the brakes and returning to the station.

Awards

References

External links
 

Roller coasters in Sweden